Summer lilac most commonly refers to Buddleja davidii, a widely cultivated ornamental shrub also known as the butterfly bush.  It may also refer to:

Other Buddleja species and cultivars
Hesperis matronalis, a herbaceous plant also known as dame's rocket and sweet rocket
A Hemerocallis interspecies hybrid, the summer lilac daylily

See also
Lilac (disambiguation)